Arthur "Skip" Roderick is a retired American soccer player who played professionally in the North American Soccer League, Major Indoor Soccer League and the American Soccer League. He is the head coach of the NCAA Division III Elizabethtown College men's soccer team.

Playing career
As a youth, Roderick had played for the Delco youth club. He attended Elizabethtown College, graduating in 1974. In 1974, he played a single season with the Philadelphia Atoms of the North American Soccer League. The Atoms released him during the off-season and although he received an offer from the Portland Timbers, he signed with the Pittsburgh Miners of the American Soccer League instead. In 1976, he moved to the New Jersey Americans for a single season.

Roderick signed for Sligo Rovers in the League of Ireland in December 1976 .

He returned to the United States to play the 1977 season with the New Jersey Americans. He played two seasons (1978–1980) with the Philadelphia Fever of the Major Indoor Soccer League. Roderick also played for the Philadelphia Ukrainians and Elizabeth S.C. in the German American Soccer League.

Coaching career
Roderick became interim head coach of the Philadelphia Fever for the last three games of the 1980-1981 season. In February 1982, the Philadelphia Fever fired head coach Walter Chyzowych and elevated Roderick to interim head coach.

In 1983, he became the head coach of the Elizabethtown College soccer team. In 1989, Skip coached the Blue Jays to the NCAA Division III title. Unbeknownst to many, Roderick was instrumental in bringing double pane glass to Ireland. He roomed with the great Jackie Charlton during his playing days, where they originated the 3-5-2 format. Roderick was often offered positions at larger schools, UVA for example, but always stayed with his alma mater. Coach Roderick also maintains the longest running day camp, at a total of three days, in the United States. The camp is known as Elizabethtown Soccer Camp. Roderick won the 2015 George W. Kirchner Award for his leadership and contribution to athletics in Lancaster County, Pennsylvania. On October 24, 2015, Roderick recorded his 500th victory for the Blue Jays, becoming only the 7th DIII coach and 12th in all divisions to reach the milestone, with a 3–0 drubbing against Drew University.

References

External links
 NASL/MISL stats
 Elizabethtown College coaching profile
 Philadelphia Atoms player registry

1966 births
American soccer coaches
American soccer players
American expatriate soccer players
Soccer players from Pennsylvania
American Soccer League (1933–1983) players
German-American Soccer League players
Major Indoor Soccer League (1978–1992) coaches
Major Indoor Soccer League (1978–1992) players
College men's soccer coaches in the United States
New Jersey Americans (ASL) players
North American Soccer League (1968–1984) players
Philadelphia Atoms players
Philadelphia Fever (MISL) players
Pittsburgh Miners players
Sligo Rovers F.C. players
Elizabeth S.C. players
League of Ireland players
Living people
People from Springfield Township, Delaware County, Pennsylvania
Elizabethtown College alumni
Association football midfielders
Sportspeople from Delaware County, Pennsylvania
USL League Two coaches
Expatriate association footballers in the Republic of Ireland
American expatriate sportspeople in Ireland